Some people named Dorothy Richards include:
 Dorothy Ann Richards, Texas politician
 Dorothy Pilley Richards, Welsh mountaineer
 Dorothy Burney Richards, American conservationist
 Dorothy Richards (writer), Australian writer